Rzepki may refer to the following places:
Rzepki, Łódź Voivodeship (central Poland)
Rzepki, Masovian Voivodeship (east-central Poland)
Rzepki, Warmian-Masurian Voivodeship (north Poland)